Rafael Morales Casas (31 July 1919 - 29 June 2005) was a Spanish poet. He was born in Talavera de la Reina in the province of Toledo, and studied in Madrid and Coimbra. Among his best-known work is the 1943 collection Poemas del toro.

Works
 Poemas del toro, M., Col. Adonais, 1943.
 El corazón y la tierra, Valladolid, Halcón, 1946.
 Los desterrados, M., Col. Adonais, 1947.
 Poemas del toro y otros versos, M., Afrodisio Aguado, 1949 (Prólogo de José María de Cossío).
 Canción sobre el asfalto, M., Los Poetas, 1954 (Premio Nacional de Literatura).
 Antología y pequeña historia de mis versos, M., Escelicer, 1958.
 La máscara y los dientes, M., Prensa Española, 1962.
 Poesías completas, M., Giner, 1967.
 La rueda y el viento, Salamanca, Álamo, 1971.
 Obra poética (1943-1981), M., Espasa-Calpe, 1982 (Con el libro inédito Prado de Serpientes. Prólogo de Claudio Rodríguez).
 Entre tantos adioses, Melilla, Rusadir, 1993.
 Obra poética completa (1943-1999), M., Calambur, 1999.
 Poemas de la luz y la palabra (2003).

References

1919 births
2005 deaths
20th-century Spanish poets